USS Evans (DD-552), a , was the second ship of the United States Navy to be named for Rear Admiral Robley D. Evans (1846–1912).

Construction and commissioning

Evans was launched on 4 October 1942 by the Gulf Shipbuilding Company at Chickasaw, Alabama sponsored by Mrs. C. E. Isherwood, and commissioned on 11 December 1943.

Pacific service

Marianas 
Evans reached Majuro on 29 March 1944 from Pearl Harbor and the East Coast, and after escorting  to a midocean fueling rendezvous, conducted independent antisubmarine patrols around Japanese-held atolls in the Marshall Islands until 13 May. After training in the Hawaiian Islands, she departed Pearl Harbor on 3 June to screen the fueling and aircraft replacement group supporting both the fast carrier task force and the carrier escort force during the assault and capture of Saipan which began on 15 June. She continued to screen this fueling group through the summer as the Marianas were won, returning to Eniwetok to replenish from time to time.

Palau and Ulithi 
On 26 August 1944, Evans sailed from Eniwetok to screen the fueling and aircraft replacement group for the assault and occupation of the Palau Islands, and arriving at Ulithi on 30 October, served on patrol and escort duty there through 11 January 1945. After a special assignment to hunt submarines near Yap and to bombard that island, from 11 to 13 January, Evans sailed to Saipan, from which she screened transports to the landings on Iwo Jima on 19 February. She conducted shore bombardment and supported the troops ashore with harassing fire on Japanese positions, then screened escort carriers until 8 March, when she sailed to Ulithi.

Okinawa 
Evans cleared Ulithi on 21 March 1945 to screen escort carriers in pre-invasion air strikes on Okinawa and served with them through the 1 April assault on the island, and until 2 May, when she put into Kerama Retto. During the first night on station, 10–11 May, enemy planes were constantly in evidence; more than a hundred attacked the two destroyers and the two LCSs with them. Evans fought determinedly against this overwhelming assault, shooting down many of them, but in quick succession, four kamikazes struck her. After engineering spaces flooded, and she lost power, Evans crew strove to save her, using portable fire extinguishers and bucket brigades. They succeeded, though 32 were killed and 27 wounded, and the ship was towed into Kerama Retto on 14 May for repairs. She was awarded the Presidential Unit Citation for high gallantry and achievement.

Decommissioned and scrapped
After emergency repairs at Kerama Retto, Evans was towed to San Francisco, where she was decommissioned on 7 November, and stricken from the Naval Vessel Register on 28 November 1945. She was sold for scrap on 11 February 1947.

Honors
In addition to the Presidential Unit Citation, Evans received five battle stars for her World War II service.

  Presidential Unit Citation

References

Staton, Michael. The Fighting Bob: A Wartime History of the USS ROBLEY D. EVANS (DD-552). Bennington, Vermont: Merriam Press, 2012. .

External links
navsource.org: USS Evans
hazegray.org: USS Evans
NHC Photos, USS Evans (DD-552)

 

World War II destroyers of the United States
Ships built in Chickasaw, Alabama
1942 ships
Fletcher-class destroyers of the United States Navy
Maritime incidents in May 1945